The dwarf catshark (Asymbolus parvus) is a catshark of the family Scyliorhinidae, found only off the coast of Western Australia, at depths between 200 and 400 m. Its length is up to 44 cm.

References

 
 Environment-Australian Government
 Compagno, L.J.V., Dando, M. & Fowler, S. 2005. A Field Guide to the Sharks of the World. London : Collins 368 pp. [208]
 Last, P.R. & Stevens, J.D. 1994. Sharks and Rays of Australia. Canberra : CSIRO Australia 513 pp. 84 pls figs [172, 181 fig. 26.9 pl. 22] (as Asymbolus sp. A)
 Last, P.R. & Stevens, J.D. 2009. Sharks and Rays of Australia. Collingwood : CSIRO Publishing Australia 2nd Edn 550 pp. [200]

dwarf catshark
Marine fish of Western Australia
dwarf catshark